The Fort Smith School District (or Fort Smith Public Schools) is the major public school district based in Fort Smith, Arkansas, United States.

The system consists of 26 schools that provide early childhood, elementary and secondary education to students in pre-kindergarten through grade 12 and serves the following Sebastian County communities: the majority of Fort Smith and the western portion of Barling.

History 
The district enacted a mask mandate during the COVID-19 pandemic in Arkansas. The district continued it beyond the anticipated end date of October 2021 into at least November.

Schools

Secondary schools
High/Secondary Schools
 Northside High School (9–12)
 Southside High School (9–12)

Middle/Intermediate Schools
 Dora Kimmons Middle School (6–8)
 L. A. Chaffin Middle School (6–8)
 Ramsey Middle School (6–8)
 William O. Darby Middle School (6–8)

Elementary/Primary Schools
 Ballman Elementary School (K–5)
 Barling Elementary School (PK–5)
 Beard Elementary School (PK–5)
 Bonneville Elementary School (PK–5)
 Carnall Elementary School (K–5)
 Cavanaugh Elementary School (K–5)
 Elmer H. Cook Elementary School (K–5)
 Euper Lane Elementary School (K–5)
 Fairview Elementary School (PK–5)
 Harry C. Morrison Elementary School (PK–5)
 Howard Elementary School (PK–5)
 John P. Woods Elementary School (K–5)
 Park Elementary School (K–5) 
 Raymond F. Orr Elementary School (PK–5)
 Spradling Elementary School (K–5)
 Sunnymede Elementary School (K–5)
 Sutton Elementary School (K–5)
 Tilles Elementary School (PK–5)
 Trusty Elementary School (K–5)

Special Schools & Programs
 Belle Point Alternative Center (7–12)

See also 

 List of school districts in Arkansas

References

External links 
FortSmithSchools.org - Official Website

School District, Fort Smith
School districts in Arkansas
Education in Sebastian County, Arkansas
Year of establishment missing